Minuscule 584 (in the Gregory-Aland numbering), ε 1010 (von Soden), is a Greek minuscule manuscript of the New Testament, on parchment. Palaeographically it has been assigned to the 10th century. The manuscript is lacunose. It was labelled by Scrivener as 453.

Description 

The codex contains the text of the four Gospels on 319 leaves (size ) with only one lacuna (Matthew 1:1-20). It is written in one column per page, 20 lines per page.

Numerals of the Ammonian sections (in Mark 234 sections, the last in 16:9), with references to the Eusebian Canons, whose are given in the same line as number of Ammonian Sections (see Minuscule 112, 583).

It contains Epistula ad Carpianum, Eusebian tables at the beginning of the manuscript. It contains lectionary markings at the margin, incipits, subscriptions at the end of books, and marginal notes.
It is very tastefully decorated. Some marginal corrections were made by the first hand in vermilion.

Text 

The Greek text of the codex is a representative of the Byzantine text-type. Aland placed it in Category V. According to Claremont Profile Method it represents the textual family Kx in Luke 1, Luke 10, and Luke 20. It creates cluster with Codex Athous Dionysiou.

It lacks the Pericope Adulterae (John 7:53-8:11).

History 

It is dated by the INTF to the 10th-century.

The manuscript currently housed in at the Biblioteca Palatina (Ms. Parm. 65), at Parma.

See also 

 List of New Testament minuscules
 Biblical manuscript
 Textual criticism

Notes

References

Further reading 

 

Greek New Testament minuscules
10th-century biblical manuscripts